Juan de Labrada, O.P.  (died 1613) was a Roman Catholic prelate who served as Bishop of Cartagena (1597–1613).

Biography
Juan de Labrada was born in Granada, Spain and ordained a priest in the Order of Preachers.
On 29 Jan 1597, he was appointed during the papacy of Pope Alexander VI as Bishop of Cartagena.
On Dec 1597, he was consecrated bishop by Domingo de Ulloa, Bishop of Popayán. 
He served as Bishop of Cartagena until his death on 22 Jul 1613.

References

External links and additional sources
 (for Chronology of Bishops) 
 (for Chronology of Bishops) 

16th-century Roman Catholic bishops in New Granada
17th-century Roman Catholic bishops in New Granada
Bishops appointed by Pope Alexander VI
Roman Catholic bishops of Cartagena in Colombia
1597 deaths
Dominican bishops
People from Granada